Molybdenum(VI) chloride is the inorganic compound with the formula MoCl6.  It is a black diamagnetic solid. The molecules adopt an octahedral structure as seen in β-tungsten(VI) chloride.

Preparation and reactions
Molybdenum(VI) chloride is prepared from the molybdenum hexafluoride with excess boron trichloride:
 MoF6 + 3 BCl3 → MoCl6 + 3 BF2Cl

It is unstable at room temperature with respect to molybdenum(V) chloride and decomposition completes within several days:
2 MoCl6 → [MoCl5]2 + Cl2

References

Molybdenum(VI) compounds
Chlorides
Molybdenum halides